Barbastella is a genus of vespertilionid bats. There are seven extant species in this genus and one only known from fossil remains.

Species
The genus consists of the following species:

 Barbastella barbastellus – western barbastelle
 Barbastella beijingensis – Beijing barbastelle
 Barbastella caspica – Caspian barbastelle 
 Barbastella darjelingensis – eastern barbastelle or Asian barbastelle
 Barbastella leucomelas – Arabian barbastelle
 Barbastella pacifica – Japanese barbastelle 
 Barbastella maxima

References

External links
 
 

 
Bat genera
Taxa named by John Edward Gray